WMPC (1230 kHz) is a non-commercial AM radio station licensed to Lapeer, Michigan, and serving the northern suburbs of Detroit and the Flint area. It broadcasts a Christian talk and teaching radio format and is owned by the Calvary Bible Church of Lapeer.

WMPC is powered at 1,000 watts non-directional.  The radio studios and transmitter are on North Lapeer Road in Lapeer.  Programming is also heard on 250-watt FM translator W295CT at 106.9 MHz.

Programming
WMPC has a schedule of local and national religious leaders.  Hosts heard on WMPC include Chuck Swindoll, John MacArthur, Charles Stanley and David Jeremiah.  Late nights feature Contemporary Christian music.

WMPC is a non-commercial, non-profit radio station.  It holds a "Sharathon" on-air fundraiser twice a year to support the expenses of operating the station.

History
It broadcast from a homemade transmitter in the Methodist Protestant Church of Lapeer. In the 1930s, the frequency was 1200 kilocycles. It was a "share time" station, required to work out a schedule with the other nearby stations on 1200 AM. The power was only 100 watts.

With the 1941 enactment of the North American Regional Broadcasting Agreement (NARBA), WMPC moved to 1230 AM.  It increased its power to 250 watts.  The church's name had changed to the Liberty Street Gospel Church at 803 Liberty Street in Lapeer.  WMPC was still required to share its time on the air with another radio station.

In the 1970s, the church changed its name to the Calvary Bible Church.  WMPC increased its daytime power to 1,000 watts and was no longer required to share its time on the air with other nearby stations on its frequency.  The radio station has only had four managers over the years: Rev. Frank S. Hemingway, Rev. Arnold Bracy, Bob Baldwin, and the current manager, Ed LeVoir.

In the 2000s, WMPC added an FM translator at 106.9 MHz, for listeners who prefer to hear the station on FM radio.

References

Michiguide.com - WMPC History

External links

Moody Radio affiliate stations
Radio stations established in 1926

MPC